Liverpool Women's Hospital is a major obstetrics, gynaecology and neonatology research hospital in Liverpool, England. It is one of several specialist hospitals located within the Liverpool City Region, alongside Alder Hey Children's Hospital, Liverpool Heart and Chest Hospital, the Walton Centre, Mersey Regional Burns and Plastic Surgery Unit and Clatterbridge Cancer Centre. It is managed by the Liverpool Women's NHS Foundation Trust. The hospital receives approximately 50,000 patients annually and is the largest hospital for its specialism in Europe.

History

The hospital, which replaced the Women's Hospital in Catharine Street, the Liverpool Maternity Hospital, and Mill Road Maternity Hospital in a single new building in Crown Street, was designed by the Percy Thomas Partnership and was constructed in red brick with white cladding and light blue metal roofs. It was officially opened by Diana, Princess of Wales in November 1995.

A sculpture entitled Mother and Child was erected outside the main entrance to the hospital in 1999 by Terry McDonald.

The hospital was investigated in 2018 as part of the investigation into the Countess of Chester Hospital baby deaths, as main suspect Lucy Letby had previously worked there.

2021 attack

On 14 November 2021, police were called at approximately 11:00 a.m. UTC following reports of a car explosion. The building went into lockdown and was cordoned off by the police; a man died and another was injured. Counter-terrorism police are leading the investigation. It has been confirmed that the dead man was the passenger in the taxi and that the injured man was the driver.

See also
 List of hospitals in England

References

External links
Liverpool Women's NHS Foundation Trust

Hospital buildings completed in 1995
Hospitals in Liverpool
NHS hospitals in England
Women's hospitals